The 2017 USA Women's Sevens was the third tournament of the 2016–17 World Rugby Women's Sevens Series, held from March 3–5, 2017 at the Sam Boyd Stadium in Whitney, Nevada, a community in the Las Vegas area. This was the first edition of the Women's Sevens held alongside the USA Sevens men's tournament.

Format
The teams were drawn into three pools of four teams each. Each team played every other team in their pool once. The top two teams from each pool advanced to the Cup/Plate brackets while the top 2 third place teams also competed for the Cup/Plate. The other teams from each group played off for the Challenge Trophy.

Teams
The participating teams include:

Pool stage

Pool A

Pool B

Pool C

Knockout stage

Challenge Trophy

5th place

Cup

Tournament placings

Source: World Rugby

See also
 2017 USA Sevens
 World Rugby Women's Sevens Series
 2016–17 World Rugby Women's Sevens Series
 World Rugby

References

2016
2016–17 World Rugby Women's Sevens Series
2017 in women's rugby union
2017 in American rugby union
rugby union
2017 rugby sevens competitions
2017 in sports in Nevada